Hellship Bronson is a lost 1928 silent film adventure directed by Joseph Henabery and starring Noah Beery and Dorothy Davenport (aka Mrs. Wallace Reid). It was produced by Gotham Pictures and distributed by Lumas Film Corporation.

Cast
Dorothy Davenport as Mrs. Bronson (*as Mrs. Wallace Reid)
Noah Beery as Capt. Ira Bronson
Reed Howes as Tim Bronson
Helen Foster as Mary Younger
James Bradbury Jr. as The Hoofer
Jack Anthony as Abner Starke

References

External links

1928 films
American silent feature films
Lost American films
Films directed by Joseph Henabery
American black-and-white films
American adventure films
1928 adventure films
1928 lost films
Lost adventure films
Gotham Pictures films
1920s American films
Silent adventure films